"To Be or Not to Be" (also known as "The Hitler Rap") is a song recorded by Mel Brooks in 1983 for Island Records. The song appeared on the soundtrack album for the movie of the same name. It was derived from the burlesque show within the film but did not appear within it. It also echoes Brooks' 1967 film The Producers, with the lines "Don't be stupid, be a smarty. Come and join the Nazi Party," taken from the song "Springtime for Hitler".

In the accompanying music video, Mel Brooks is dressed like Adolf Hitler and raps about the key events in Hitler's life in Nazi Germany. The ending makes reference to Hitler's alleged escape to Argentina at the end of World War II.

While having limited success in the United States, the song managed to chart high in Australia and the United Kingdom, peaking at number three in the former country and number 12 on the UK Singles Chart. It also reached number one in Norway and number two in Sweden.

Track listing
 12" single
 "To Be or Not to Be (The Hitler Rap) (Part 1)" – 7:43   
 "To Be or Not to Be (The Hitler Rap) (Part 2)" (Instrumental Mix) – 7:51

Charts

Weekly charts

Year-end charts

References

Songs written for films
1983 singles
Satirical songs
Comedy songs
Black comedy music
Novelty songs
Songs about Adolf Hitler
Songs about World War II
Works by Mel Brooks
Song recordings produced by Pete Wingfield
1983 songs
Island Records singles
Number-one singles in Norway